Pantropy is a hypothetical process of space habitation or space colonization in which, rather than terraforming other planets or building space habitats suitable for human habitation, humans are modified (for example via genetic engineering) to be able to thrive in the existing environment. The term was coined by science fiction author James Blish, who wrote a series of short stories based on the idea (collected in the anthology The Seedling Stars).

Fictional depictions

 1930—In the science fiction novel Last and First Men by Olaf Stapledon, when humanity migrates from Earth to Venus and later from Venus to Neptune, human beings are genetically engineered to fit the new environments in which they will be living.
 1944—One of the first science fiction stories about pantropy (the word had not yet been coined) was the short story "Desertion," by Clifford D. Simak, which appeared in the November 1944 Astounding Science Fiction. In this story, human colonists living in a domed city on the planet Jupiter are put through a biological converter that converts their bodies into the form of the indigenous Jovian lifeform called the "Lopers."  The head director of the domed colony, Kent Fowler, wondering why none of those biologically converted ever come back, goes into the biological converter himself with his dog and finds that the reason they never come back is that the Lopers have brains and senses so much in advance of humans that they don't want to come back.  He also finds that he is able to completely accurately telepathically communicate with his dog Towser (whose intelligence has also greatly increased) after going through the converter.  He himself decides not to go back. The story was incorporated into the novel City (1952).
 1957—The Seedling Stars, by James Blish, a collection of science fiction stories about pantropy. The best-known of these is "Surface Tension," often anthologized in its original 1952 standalone version.
 1976—Frederik Pohl's novel Man Plus is a story about the transformation of a human into a hybrid/cyborg in order to allow him to live comfortably on Mars.  In the sequel, Mars Plus, some colonists opt for an intermediate existence, and are known as Creoles.
 1981-1983—Jack L. Chalker's Four Lords of the Diamond series describes the changes in personality that result from physical changes caused by a symbiotic microorganism that adapts humans into a form that can survive on each of four different planets.
 1985—Bruce Sterling's Schismatrix universe has protagonist Abelard Malcolm Tyler Lindsay propose pantropy to colonize the moon of Jupiter, Europa. Other instances of pantropy include a character becoming a living ecosystem, and Lindsay's eventual transformation into a non-physical form to allow for universal travel.
 1989-1997—Dan Simmons' Hyperion Cantos is a series of four books featuring a faction known as the Ousters, which use pantropy as a way of living in harmony with nature and space.
 1990—Dougal Dixon's book Man After Man features the Vacuumorph, a form of humans modified to live in space, as well as many posthuman species physically and genetically engineered to live in various Earth environments. The humans who leave Earth at the beginning of the book to colonize other planets are also implied to have done this.
 2000—Stephen Baxter's novels repeatedly deal with pantropy as an approach to the far future of the human species.
 2002—Timothy Zahn's novel Manta's Gift features technology capable of transmitting human consciousness to an alien body.
 2006—C. M. Kosemen's book All Tomorrows features the Star People, a genetically modified race of humans adapted for space travel. Some of their descendants become the Spacers, and later the Asteromorphs, who are only able to live in a microgravity environment.
 2009—James Cameron's film Avatar is a somewhat different take on pantropy, featuring "avatars", hybrids of humans and the alien Na'vi native to Pandora.
 2011—In the manga Terra Formars, humans sent to Mars undergo genetic modification to inherit the characteristics of other organisms.
 2014—In the video game Civilization: Beyond Earth, the Harmony affinity represents pantropy.''

References

Further reading 

 
 
 

Science fiction themes
Space colonization
Transhumanism